Matevos "Matos" Isaakyan (born 17 April 1998) is a Russian racing driver. He is a current member of the SMP Racing driver programme.

Career

Karting
Born in Moscow, Isaakyan began karting in his native Russia in 2010, finishing fifth in the Russian Super Mini Championship. The following year he stepped up to the Russian KF3 Championship, finishing seventh, before placing fifth in the same category in 2012.

French F4
Isaakyan graduated to single-seaters in 2013, racing in the French F4 Championship. He took five podium places and two fastest laps on his way to fifth in the championship.

Toyota Racing Series
In January and February 2014, Isaakyan raced in the New Zealand-based Toyota Racing Series for the ETEC Motorsport team. He took a best race result of sixth at the opening round in Teretonga to finish ninth in the championship, one place behind teammate and fellow Russian Denis Korneev.

Formula Renault 2.0
Isaakyan's main racing program for 2014 was in the Formula Renault 2.0 Alps championship, racing for Italian team JD Motorsport. He was ineligible to race at the first round of the season in Imola due to the fact he had not yet turned 16 years of age. He was, however, allowed to take part in the free practice sessions.

During the season, Isaakyan took seven podium places, including a double win at the Red Bull Ring, to finish third in the championship, behind Charles Leclerc and champion Nyck de Vries. He also finished second to Leclerc in the Junior Championship standings. Isaakyan also contested the opening three rounds of the 2014 Eurocup Formula Renault 2.0 season, taking a best race result of seventh at both Spa-Francorchamps and Moscow Raceway.

In 2015, Isaakyan remained with JD Motorsport to contest full-seasons in both Eurocup Formula Renault 2.0 and Formula Renault 2.0 Alps.

GP3 Series
Isaakyan made his debut with Koiranen GP at the Bahrain round of the 2015 season and finished twenty first with two points. The following year, Isaakyan competed with the team full-time and finished seventeenth overall (his highest race result being fourth in the sprint race at Spa-Francorchamps.

Formula V8 3.5
Whilst competing full-time in GP3, Isaakyan debuted in the series with SMP Racing in place of original choice Vladimir Atoev. He claimed his maiden victory in the sport at the first race at Jerez and finished ninth overall.

Formula 2
In , Isaakyan entered the final two rounds of the FIA Formula 2 Championship for Charouz Racing System replacing injured Sauber Junior driver Juan Manuel Correa.

Racing record

Career summary

† As Isaakyan was a guest driver, he was ineligible for championship points.

Complete GP3 Series results
(key) (Races in bold indicate pole position) (Races in italics indicate fastest lap)

Complete World Series Formula V8 3.5 results
(key) (Races in bold indicate pole position) (Races in italics indicate fastest lap)

Complete European Le Mans Series results

Complete FIA World Endurance Championship results

Complete 24 Hours of Le Mans results

Complete FIA Formula 2 Championship results
(key) (Races in bold indicate pole position) (Races in italics indicate points for the fastest lap of top ten finishers)

References

External links

1998 births
Living people
Sportspeople from Moscow
Russian racing drivers
French F4 Championship drivers
Formula Renault 2.0 Alps drivers
Formula Renault Eurocup drivers
Toyota Racing Series drivers
Russian GP3 Series drivers
Russian sportspeople of Armenian descent
World Series Formula V8 3.5 drivers
European Le Mans Series drivers
Russian Circuit Racing Series drivers
FIA World Endurance Championship drivers
24 Hours of Le Mans drivers
FIA Formula 2 Championship drivers
SMP Racing drivers
Auto Sport Academy drivers
JD Motorsport drivers
Koiranen GP drivers
Charouz Racing System drivers
AV Formula drivers
AF Corse drivers